

General Mythology 
 Acquainted With the Night by Christopher Dewdney (2004)
 The Golden Bough by Sir James George Frazer (1890)
 Gods and Fighting Men by Lady Augusta Gregory (1904)
 The Hero with a Thousand Faces - by Joseph Campbell (1949) (comparative mythology)
 The Hero's Journey by Joseph Campbell (1990) (comparative mythology)
 In the Light of Truth: The Grail Message, by Oskar Ernst Bernhardt (1931)
 Lemprière's Bibliotheca Classica, by John Lemprière (1788)
 Man and His Symbols by Carl Jung (1960)
 Mythology by Edith Hamilton (1942)
 Myths and Reality by Mircea Eliade (translated from French) (1963) 
 Myths to Live By by Joseph Campbell (1972)
 The Power of Myth by Joseph Campbell (1988)
 The White Goddess by Robert Graves (1948, expanded 1966)
 Worlds in Collision by Immanuel Velikovsky (1950) (comparative mythology)
Derivative works:
 American Gods by Neil Gaiman (2001)
 Modern Disciples series by I.S. Anderson (2011) (Fiction Based on several different mythologies)

Australian Mythology 
 The Songlines by ,Bruce Chatwin (1987)

Chinese Mythology 
Derivative works:

 Where The Mountain Meets the Moon by Grace Lin (2009)
 Daughter of the Moon Goddess by Sue Lynn Tan (2022)

Egyptian Mythology 
Derivative works:

 The Kane Chronicles by Rick Riordan (2010-2012)
 The Chaos of Stars by Kiersten White (2013)

Greek Mythology 
 The Greek Myths by Robert Graves (1955)
 Gods and Heroes of Ancient Greece by Gustav Schwab (1837)
 Gods, Heroes and Men of Ancient Greece by W. H. D. Rouse (1934)
 Bulfinch's Mythology (originally published as three volumes) by Thomas Bulfinch (1855)
 Mythology by Edith Hamilton (1942)
 Myths of the Ancient Greeks by Richard P. Martin (2003)
 The Penguin Book of Classical Myths by Jenny March (2008)
 The Gods of the Greeks by Károly Kerényi (1951)
 The Heroes of the Greeks by Károly Kerényi (1959)
 A Handbook of Greek Mythology by H. J. Rose (1928)
 The Complete World of Greek Mythology by Richard Buxton (2004)
 Metamorphoses by Ovid, published ca. 8 AD
 Theogony by Hesiod, published 7-8th century BC
 The Iliad by Homer, written 7-8th century BC
 The Odyssey by Homer, written 7-8th century BC
 The Homeric Hymns by Anonymous, written 4-7th century BC

Derivative works:
 Tanglewood Tales by Nathaniel Hawthorne (1853)
 Wonder-Book for Girls and Boys by Nathaniel Hawthorne (1852)
 Goddess of Yesterday by Caroline B. Cooney (2002)
 Percy Jackson & the Olympians series by Rick Riordan (2005-2009)
 The Penelopiad by Margaret Atwood (2005)
 The Heroes of Olympus series by Rick Riordan (2010-2014)
 Cupid's Academy by Tai Odunsi
 Starcrossed by Josephine Angelini (2011)
 The Song of Achilles by Madeline Miller (2011)
 Trials of Apollo series by Rick Riordan (2016-2020)
 Circe by Madeline Miller (2018)
 The Silence of the Girls by Pat Barker (2018)
 A Thousand Ships by Natalie Haynes (2019)
 Lore by Alexandra Bracken (2021)
 Lore Olympus by Rachel Smythe (2021)

Hindu Mythology 
 Dictionary of Hindu Lore and Legend by Anna L. Dallapiccola (2002)
 Mahabharata A modern retelling by Ramesh Menon
 Ramayana by Ramesh Menon
Derivative works:
 The Immortals of Meluha by Amish Tripathi (2010)
 The Day of Brahma by Stefania Dimitrova (2017)
 Pandava Quintet by Roshani Chokshi (2018-2022)

Japanese Mythology 
Derivative works:

 The Shadow of the Fox by Julie Kagawa (2018)

Korean Mythology 
Derivative works:

 Dragon Pearl by Yoon Ha Le (2019)

Mayan Mythology 
Derivative works:

 The Storm Runner by J. C. Cervantes (2018)
 Gods of Jade and Shadow by Silvia Moreno-Garcia (2019)

Mandaean Mythology 
 Ginza Rabba
 Mandaean Book of John

Meitei Mythology 

 And That Is Why . . . Manipuri Myths Retold
 The Tales of Kanglei Throne

Norse Mythology 
 Poetic Edda,"collection", 13th century
 Prose Edda, Snorri Sturluson, 13th century
 Norse Mythology by Neil Gaiman (2017)
Derivative works:

 The Blackwell Pages Trilogy by K.L. Armstrong and M.A. Marr (2013-2015)
 Magnus Chase and the Gods of Asgard by Rick Riordan (2015-2017)
 The Witch's Heart by Genevieve Gornichec (2021)

Roman Mythology 

 Aenid by Virgil

Derivative works:
 Lavinia by Ursula K. Le Guin (2008)
 The Heroes of Olympus series by Rick Riordan (2010-2014)

Turkish Mythology
 Book of Dede Korkut (9th century)

United States Mythology
 Fearsome Creatures of the Lumberwoods

Internet web resources
 Encyclopedia Mythica (internet encyclopedia)

Books
Lists of books about religion
Religious bibliographies